Antimima is a succulent plant genus in the family Aizoaceae, indigenous to South Africa and Namibia.

Description
The Greek word "antimimos" means "imitating", and refers to the similarity some species have to the different genus Argyroderma.

The species of this varied genus typically grow as dense cushions or mats. 
Otherwise, Antimima species are very similar in their superficial looks to the related genus Ruschia, with 3-sided waxy succulent leaves, and pink or white flowers.

Species
It contains 106 accepted species, that were split off from the related genus Ruschia. They include:

 Antimima argentea, (L.Bolus) H.E.K.Hartmann
 Antimima aurasensis, H.E.K.Hartmann
 Antimima buchubergensis, (Dinter) H.E.K.Hartmann
 Antimima eendornensis, (Dinter) H.E.K.Hartmann
 Antimima modesta, (L.Bolus) H.E.K.Hartmann
 Antimima quartzitica, (Dinter) H.E.K.Hartmann

References

 
Aizoaceae genera
Taxonomy articles created by Polbot
Taxa named by N. E. Brown